Adeleorina is a suborder of parasites in the phylum Apicomplexa.

History

Léger proposed this taxon in 1911. The first species identified was Dactylosoma ranarum by Lankester (1871) in a frog in Europe. It was initially called Undulina ranarum, but this was changed in 1882 to Drepanidium ranarum. This species was subsequently moved to the genus Dactylosoma.

Canine hepatozoonosis was first described in India in 1905 by James. The organism was named Leukocytozoon canis. The vector was identified in 1907 by Christopher to be the brown dog tick (Rhipicephalus sanguineus). The genus Hepatozoon was created by Miller in 1908 for a parasite of the white rat (Rattus norvegicus) that underwent merogony in the liver and sporogony in the mite Laelap echidinus. Ledger initially placed this genus in the family Haemogregarinidae, but Wenyon subsequently removed it and placed it in the newly created taxon Hepatozoidae in 1926.

Life cycle

All species in this suborder use the syzygy method of gamete formation. This involves the association of often motile gamonts prior to the formation of functional gametes and fertilization.

Their life cycles tend to be complex, involving at least one (and often several) asexual cycles of merogony followed by gametogony, syngamy and sporogony. In many species of the group, the meronts and merozoites have morphologically distinct types: one type of meront produces large merozoites which initiate a further round of merogonic replication; a second produces smaller merozoites which are the progenitors of the gamonts. Microgamonts produce usually only one to four microgametes. Other characteristic features include the absence of endodyogeny and the enclosure of sporozoites in a sporocyst.

In haemogregarines with heteroxenous species, conjugation of gamonts and subsequent sporogony usually occurs within an invertebrate (definitive host), which also serves as the vector. Merogonial division usually takes place in the parenchymatous organs of the vertebrate host. This is followed by the formation of infective gametocytes in the erythrocytes. In the genus Hepatozoon, gametocytes are also formed in the leukocytes.

The haemogregarines use two modes of transmission:

 Inoculation — the infectious sporozoites enter the vertebrate host during blood-feeding of the vector (Dactylosoma, Haemogregarina)
 Ingestion — the parasite is transmitted by the ingestion of the infected invertebrate host by the vertebrate host. The mode of transmission may even involve a paratenic host. The next definitive host in the life cycle is infected exclusively through blood feeding. Examples include the genera Karyolysus, Hemolivia and Hepatozoon.

Taxonomy

Adeleorina has about 500 species, which have been organised into seven families and 19 genera. The families have been divided into two groups:

Adelines — monoxenous coccidians of invertebrates — Adeleidae and Legerellidae
Haemogregarines — heteroxenous coccidians cycling between blood-sucking invertebrates (definitive hosts) and various vertebrates (intermediate hosts) — Dactylosomatidae, Haemogregarinidae, Hepatozoidae and Karyolysidae

One exception to this classification is known: Klossiella (family Klossiellidae) is a monoxenous coccidium of mammals and reptiles.

The taxonomy is this group may be incorrect as the Hepatozoidae appear to be paraphyletic. The genus Hemolivia appears to lie within the genus Hepatozoon. The genus Hepatozoon appears to have two subgenera with one in the carnivorous mammals and the other in lower vertebrates and rodents.

Families and genera

The families in this suborder are:

Family Adeleidae Mesnil, 1903
Genera:
Chagasella Machado in 1911
Ganapatiella Kalavati, 1977
Gibbsia Levine, 1986
Klossia Schneiderin, 1875
Orcheobius Schuberg & Kunze, 1906
Rasajeyna Beesley, 1977
Subfamily Ithaniinae
Genera
Adelea Schneider, 1875
Adelina Hesse, 1911
Ithania Ludwigin, 1947
Family Dactylosomatidae Jakowska & Nigrelli, 1955
Genera:
Babesiosoma Jakowska & Nigrelli, 1956
Dactylosoma Labbé, 1894 
Family Haemogregarinidae Neveu-Lemaire, 1901
Genera:
Cyrilia Lainson, 1981
Desseria Siddall, 1995
Haemogregarina Danilewsky, 1885
Family Hepatozoidae Wenyon, 1926
Genera:
Hepatozoon Miller, 1908
Family Karyolysidae Wenyon, 1926
Genera:
Karyolysus Labbé, 1894
Hemolivia Petit et al, 1990
Family Klossiellidae Smith & Johnson, 1902
Genera:
Klossiella
Family Legerellidae Minchin, 1903
Genera:
Legerella Mesnil, 1900

Notes

Karyolysus infects lizards (Lacerta) and possibly scincids.  Haemogregarina infects turtles and leeches. Species of the genus Desseria infect fish and lack erythrocytic merogony.  The genera in the subfamily Ithaniinae share a number of morphological features and infect the digestive tract of insects.

DNA studies suggest Hemolivia may lie within the Hepatozoon clade. If this can be confirmed, the taxonomy of this group will need revision. A study of the 18s rRNA gene suggests that there may be some overlap between Karyolysus and Hepatozoon.

Karadjian, Chavatte and Landau revised the Adeleidae in 2015, performed a molecular analysis and proposed a new classification in four 'types' based on their biology, as follows:
Type I, Hepatozoon Miller, 1908, with type species H. perniciosum Miller, 1908
Type II, Karyolysus Labbé, 1894, with type species K. lacertae (Danilewsky, 1886) Reichenow, 1913
Type III Hemolivia Petit et al., 1990, with type species H. stellata Petit et al., 1990
Type IV: Bartazoon Karadjian, Chavatte and Landau, 2015, with type species B. breinli (Mackerras, 1960).

References

SAR supergroup suborders
Conoidasida
Parasites of bats
Parasites of dogs
Parasites of amphibians